Johan Holger Jensen (30 December 1898 – 26 November 1983) was a Danish boxer who competed in the 1920 Summer Olympics. He was born and died in Aarhus. In 1920 he was eliminated in the first round of the lightweight class after losing to the upcoming bronze medalist Clarence Newton.

References

External links
 profile

1898 births
1983 deaths
Lightweight boxers
Olympic boxers of Denmark
Boxers at the 1920 Summer Olympics
Danish male boxers
Sportspeople from Aarhus